CKVS-FM is a community radio station broadcasting on the frequency of 93.7 MHz/FM in Salmon Arm, British Columbia, Canada.

History

On August 21, 2012, Voice of the Shuswap Broadcast Society, the owner of the new 93.7 FM received Canadian Radio-television and Telecommunications Commission (CRTC) approval to operate a new low-power community FM radio station at Salmon Arm.  The radio station began broadcasting December 10, 2012. According to the Canadian Communications Foundation website, CKVS-FM began on-air testing in February 2013.

References

External links
Voice of the Shuswap - CKVS-FM 93.7 Public Radio
 

Kvs
Salmon Arm
Kvs
Radio stations established in 2012
2012 establishments in British Columbia